Megan Allely (born 4 October 1988 in Cape Town) is a South African figure skater. She is the 2009 South African silver medalist.

Programs

Competitive highlights

 N = Novice level; J = Junior level; QR = Qualifying Round; WD = Withdrawn

External links
 Tracings.net profile
 

South African female single skaters
1988 births
Sportspeople from Cape Town
Living people